Khaniadhana or Khaniyadhana was a princely state of British India ruled by the Judev dynasty of Bundela Rajputs. The capital of the State was Khaniadhana. It was part of the Bundelkhand Agency and later the Central India Agency.

The princely state of Khaniadhana, was made of several small enclaves, bounded on the east by the British district of Jhansi but otherwise completely surrounded by the Narwar district of Gwalior State. Khaniadhana State was part of the Gwalior Residency. It was located to the west of Orchha State. It covered a total area of 101 sq m spread over 55 villages and the total population of the territory during the British rule was 20,124 as per census of 1941.

History
In 1724, Raja Udot Singh of Orchha State granted Khaniadhana and several other villages to his son Amar Singh. When the Marathas became the paramount power in Bundelkhand, the Peshwa granted Amar Singh a sanad in 1751 confirming him in his grant. After this time, suzerainty was always in dispute between Orchha and the Maratha state of Jhansi, the Peshwa's eventual successor. When Jhansi State lapsed in 1854, the Khanadhiana jagirdar claimed absolute independence. The matter was only settled in 1862 when Khaniadhana was declared to be directly dependent from the British government as successor to the Jhansi darbar and the Peshwa. The State was one of the original constituent members of the Chamber of Princes, an institution established in 1920.

In 1948, the Khaniadhana State acceded to the Union of India and about half of Khaniadhana (27 villages) was included in Shivpuri district of Madhya Bharat while the other half (28 villages) was included in Vindhya Pradesh., which all are now part of Madhya Pradesh.

Rulers
The ruling family of Khaniadhana were Bundela Rajputs. 
The ruler of the princely state of Khaniadhana held the hereditary title of Rao or Jagirdar, but from the year 1911, the ruler was granted the title and style of Raja. It was a non-salute state and the native ruler or the Raja of the princely state exercised the powers and authority of a ruling chief.

Rajas
1724–17. .   Amar Singh 
1760–1869     Unknown succession of Rajas
1869–1909     Chitra Singh 
1909–1938     Khalak Singh 
1938–1948     Davendra Pratap Singh
1948~today     Bhanu Pratap Singh

References

External links 
 Indian Princely State Khaniadhan Fiscal Court fee and Revenue Stamps
 Imperial Gazetteer of India, v. 15, p. 243.

 

Princely states of Madhya Pradesh
Rajput princely states
States and territories disestablished in 1948
1948 disestablishments in India
History of Madhya Pradesh
1724 establishments in India
States and territories established in 1724
Shivpuri district